Sabuwal is a village in Shahkot in Jalandhar district of Punjab State, India. The village is administrated by a sarpanch who is an elected representative of village as per Panchayati raj (India) currently Baldev Singh Josen, son of Darshan Singh Josen.

Transport 
Shahkot Malisian station is the nearest train station.

References 

Villages in Jalandhar district